The Order of battle Peiking–Hankou Railway Operation  (August 1937 – January 1938)

Japan

Order of battle as of mid August – December 1937 

North China Front Army – Field Marshal, Count Hisaichi Terauchi, [1]
China Garrison Army – Lt. Gen. Kiyoshi Katsuki
 China Stationed Infantry Brigade (Kawabe Brigade) – Major Gen. Masakazu Kawabe [1]
 1st China Stationed Infantry Regiment
 2nd China Stationed Infantry Regiment
 China Stationed Cavalry Unit
 China Stationed Artillery Regiment
 China Stationed Engineer Unit
 China Stationed Tank Unit (17 tanks)
 China Stationed Signal Unit
 Army Hospital
1st Army – Lt. General Kiyoshi Katsuki [1]
 Detached Regiment of 5th Division [1] Note 1.
 14th Division – Gen. Kenji Doihara, 土肥原賢二[1]
 27th Infantry Brigade
 2nd Infantry Regiment
 59th Infantry Regiment
 28th Infantry Brigade
 15th Infantry Regiment
 50th Infantry Regiment
 20th Field Artillery Regiment	
 18th Cavalry Regiment
 14th Engineer Regiment
 14th Transport Regiment
 2nd Tank Battalion – Col. Imada  Note 3.
 6th Division – Lt. Gen. Hisao Tani 谷寿夫, [6][7]
 11th Infantry Brigade				
 13th Infantry Regiment				
 47th Infantry Regiment				
 36th Infantry Brigade				
 23rd Infantry Regiment				
 45th Infantry Regiment				
 6th Field Artillery Regiment			
 6th Cavalry Regiment				
 6th Engineer Regiment				
 6th Transport Regiment				
 20th Division – Lt. Gen Bunzaburo Kawagishi 川岸文三郎,[6][7] Note 2.
 39th Infantry Brigade
 77th Infantry Regiment
 78th Infantry Regiment
 40th Infantry Brigade
 79th Infantry Regiment
 80th Infantry Regiment
 26th Field Artillery Regiment
 28th Cavalry Regiment
 20th Engineer Regiment
 20th Transport Regiment
 1st Tank Battalion – Col. Baba, Note 2.
 108th Division – Lt-General Kumaya Shimomoto [6][7]
 25th Infantry Brigade
 117th Infantry Regiment
 132nd Infantry Regiment
 104th Infantry Brigade
 52nd Infantry Regiment
 105th Infantry Regiment
 108th Field Artillery
 108th Cavalry Regiment
 108th Engineer Regiment
 108th Transport Regiment
2nd Army – General Toshizō Nishio (early Oct. 37 from Hsiaofan Chen),[1]
 10th Division (Motorized Square Division) – Gen Rensuke Isogai (arrived early September)***?, [1]
 8th Infantry Brigade
 39th Infantry Regiment
 40th Infantry Regiment
 33rd Infantry Brigade
 10th Infantry Regiment
 63rd Infantry Regiment
 10th Field Artillery Regiment
 10th Cavalry Regiment
 10th Engineer Regiment
 10th Transport Regiment
 16th Division – Gen. Kesago Nakajima, 中島今朝吾[6][7]
 19th Infantry Brigade
 9th Infantry Regiment
 20th Infantry Regiment
 30th Infantry Brigade
 33rd Infantry Regiment
 38th Infantry Regiment
 22nd Field Artillery Regiment
 20th Cavalry Regiment
 16th Engineer Regiment
 16th Transport Regiment	
 109th Division – Maj. General Yamaoka Shigeatsu 山岡重厚 [6][7]
 31st Infantry Brigade
 69th Infantry Regiment
 107th Infantry Regiment
 118th Infantry Brigade
 119th Infantry Regiment
 136th Infantry Regiment
 109th Mountain Artillery Regt
 109th Cavalry Regiment
 109th Engineer Regiment
 109th Transport Regiment

Army Airforce [2]

Rinji Hikodan
 1st Hiko Daitai/16th Hiko Rentai – Captain Takeshi Takahashi
 1st Chutai (Kawasaki Ki-10)
 2nd Chutai (Kawasaki Ki-10)
 Base: Changpeh (08/37 – 09/37), Hailang (10/37 – 09/38)
 2nd Hiko Daitai – Major Saburo Kondo
 2nd Chutai (Kawasaki Ki-10)
 Base:  Tientsin (07/37 – 12/37)

Notes:
 1. Main force of the 5th Division was in Shanxi, involved in the Battle of Taiyuan. The temporarily detached regiment was supporting the attack on the Baoding area in mid September.[1]
 2. After the Marco Polo Bridge Incident, the conflict between Japan and China became a general war. Japan sent two tank battalions to China from Japan proper in September 1937:
 1st Tank Battalion – Col. Baba
 2nd Tank Battalion – Col. Imada

These two tank battalions were assigned to the 1st Army in Hebei. The 1st Army started to attack the Chinese in the south of Peking on September 14, and advanced towards the south. Tanks were used for infantry support and tank battalions were attached to the infantry divisions. [3] The 1st Tank Battalion was attached to the IJA 20th Division.[3]  2nd Tank Battalion was attached to IJA 14th Division.[5]

Sources 

[1] Hsu Long-hsuen and Chang Ming-kai, History of The Sino-Japanese War (1937–1945) 2nd Ed.,1971. Translated by Wen Ha-hsiung, Chung Wu Publishing; 33, 140th Lane, Tung-hwa Street, Taipei, Taiwan Republic of China.  Pg. 184–191. Map 4

[2] Sino-Japanese Air War 1937–45 

[3] Taki's IMPERIAL JAPANESE ARMY PAGE 

[4] Madej, W. Victor, Japanese Armed Forces Order of Battle, 1937–1945 [2 vols], Allentown, Pennsylvania: 1981

[5]  Forum: Pacific War 1941–1945, discussion about Shanghai Defense force Aug. 11 1937 

[6] Generals from Japan

[7] 陸軍師団長一覧 (Generals of Division)

China

Order of battle August – September 1937 [1] 

1st War Area – Chiang Kai-shek [1]  August – September 1937
 2nd Army Group – Gen. Liu Chih, deputy Sun Lien-Chun
 1st Army – Sun Lien-chung
 27th Division – Fen An-pang [r]
 30th Division – Chang Chin-chao
 31st Division – Chih Feng-cheng
 44th Separate Brigade – Chang Hua-tang
 3rd Corps – Tseng Wan-cheng
 7th Division – Tseng Wan-cheng (concurrent)
 12th Division – Tang Huai-yuan
 52nd Corps – Kuan Lin-cheng
 2nd Division – Cheng tung-kuo[r]
 25th Division – Kuan Lin-cheng[r]
 14th Army – Feng Chien-tsai
 42nd Division – Liu Yen-piao
 169th Division – Wu Shih-ming
 47th Division – Pei Chang-hui
 17th Division – Cao Shou-shan
 177th Division – Li Hsing-chung
 5th Separate Brigade – Cheng Ting-chen
 46th Separate Brigade – Pao Kang
 14th Cavalry Brigade – Chang Can-Kuei
 4th Cavalry Corps – Tan Tse-hsin (to Kaifeng mid Oct. 37)
 10th Cavalry Division – Tan Tse-hsin (concurrent)
 14th Army Group – Gen. Wei  Li Huang (to 2nd War Area, Oct. 12/ 37)
 85th Division – Chen Tieh
 14th Corps – Li Mo-yen
 10th Division – Li Mo-yen (concurrent) [r]
 83rd Division – Liu Kan[r]
 20th Army Group – Shang Chen[4]
 32nd Corps – Wan Gu-lin
 139th Division – Huang Kuang-hun
 141st Division – Sung Ken-tang
 142nd Division – Lu Chi
 53rd Corps – Wan Fu-lin
 116th Division – Chow Fu-cheng
 130th Division – Chu Hung-hsun
 91st Division – Feng Chan-hai

Order of battle  October 1937 – January 1937[1] 

1st War Area – Cheng Qian [1]
 1st Army Group – Gen. Liu Chih, deputy Sun Lien-Chun
 59th Corps – Chang Tse-chung
 38th Division – Huang Wei-kang
 180th Division – Liu Tse-chen
 68th Corps – Liu Ju-ming
 119th Division – Li Chin-tien
 143rd Division – Li Tseng-chih
 77th Corps – Feng Chih-an
 37th Division – Chang Ling-yun
 179th Division – Ho Chi-feng
 132nd Division – Wang Chang-hai
 3rd Corps – Cheng Ta-chang
 4th Cavalry Division – Wang Chi-feng
 9th Cavalry  Division – Cheng Ta-chang
 139th Division – Huang Kuang-hun
 181st Division – Shih Yu-san
 20th Army Group – Shang Chen
 32nd Corps – Gen. Shan Chen (concurrent)
 141st Division – Sung Ken-tang
 142nd Division – Lu Chi
 46th Separate Brigade – Pao Kang (deactivated after battle of Changting, Oct. 37)
 14th Cavalry Brigade – Chang Can-Kuei
 20th Army – Gen. Tang En-po
 52nd Corps – Kuan Lin-cheng
 2nd Division – Cheng tung-kuo[r]
 25th Division – Kuan Lin-cheng[r]
 13th Corps – Tang En-po (concurrent)
 4th Division – Chen Ta-ching [r]
 89th Division – Wang Chung-lien[r]
 53rd Corps – Wan Fu-lin
 116th Division – Chow Fu-cheng
 130th Division – Chu Hung-hsun
 91st Division – Feng Chan-hai

Airforce [2]
 28th Pursuit Squadron / 5th Pursuit Group – Captain Chan Kee-Wong
 Curtiss Hawk II and III Fighters, Gloster Gladiator Fighters

Note:
 [r] - Reorganized Divisions [3]

Sources 

[1] Hsu Long-hsuen and Chang Ming-kai, History of The Sino-Japanese War (1937–1945) 2nd Ed.,1971. Translated by Wen Ha-hsiung, Chung Wu Publishing; 33, 140th Lane, Tung-hwa Street, Taipei, Taiwan Republic of China.  Pg. 184–191, Map 4.

[2] Sino-Japanese Air War 1937–45

[3] History of the Frontal War Zone in the Sino-Japanese War, published by Nanjing University Press.

Besides the eight German trained Reorganized Divisions were 12 other Reorganized Divisions with Chinese arms on the reorganized model with two German advisors:

2nd, 4th, 10th, 11th, 25th, 27th, 57th, 67th, 80th, 83rd, 89th Division

These were to be trained by large teams of German advisors like the earlier eight divisions but the start of the war with Japan precluded that.

[4] Generals of World War II, China

Peiking–Hankou Railway
Peiking–Hankou Railway